Antunovac is a municipality in Osijek-Baranja County, Croatia. There are 3,703 inhabitants, 96% of which are Croats (2011 census). The municipality consists of two villages: Antunovac (2,181 inhabitants) and Ivanovac (1,522 inhabitants). Antunovac is underdeveloped municipality which is statistically classified as the First Category Area of Special State Concern by the Government of Croatia.

References

External links

Municipalities of Osijek-Baranja County